Bedok Reservoir MRT station is an underground Mass Rapid Transit station on the Downtown Line in Bedok, Singapore, located at Bedok Reservoir Road, beside Bedok North Avenue 3. It serves residents living near Bedok Reservoir. The station also serves the students of Bedok Green Secondary School, Yu Neng Primary School, Fengshan Primary School and Red Swastika School.

History

Contract 927 for the design and construction of Bedok Reservoir MRT station and associated tunnels was awarded to Cooperativa Muratori & Cementisti - C.M.C di Ravenna at an estimated sum of S$196.46 million in July 2011. Construction started in August 2011, except for the part of Bedok Reservoir Road whereby it was used to do sewage diversion works. This had been used for walkway realignment, but the remainder of construction started in September that year.

The station opened on 21 October 2017, as announced by the Land Transport Authority on 31 May that year.

References

External links

Railway stations in Singapore opened in 2017
Bedok
Mass Rapid Transit (Singapore) stations